See You Later, Alligator is a 1985 Blackford Oakes novel by William F. Buckley, Jr. It is the sixth of 11 novels in the series.

Plot
CIA agent Blackford Oakes is sent to Cuba in 1961 to meet with Che Guevara, attempting to ease tension following the events surrounding the Bay of Pigs Invasion in the 1960s.

Reception
See You Later, Alligator reached number one on The New York Times bestseller list in June, 1985.

References

1985 American novels
Blackford Oakes novels
Novels set in Cuba
Fiction set in the 1960s
Doubleday (publisher) books